Anastacio Vera (born 5 October 1985 in Lambaré, Paraguay) is a Paraguayan footballer currently playing for Everton of the Primera B Chilena.

Teams
  Olimpia 2006
  Libertad 2007
  Everton 2007–present

References
 
 

1985 births
Living people
Paraguayan footballers
Paraguayan expatriate footballers
Club Libertad footballers
Club Olimpia footballers
Everton de Viña del Mar footballers
Expatriate footballers in Chile
Association footballers not categorized by position